Telstar 401 is a communications satellite owned by AT&T Corporation, which was launched in 1993, to replace Telstar 301. It was rendered inoperable by a magnetic storm in 1997.

At the time of its loss it served as the home base for TV networks such as Fox Broadcasting, CBS, PBS, ABC, and UPN.

The satellite is now space debris, remaining in geosynchronous orbit.

References

External links

 Gunter's Space Page - Telstar 401, 402, 402R
 Nasa NSSDC Entry

Communications satellites in geostationary orbit
Spacecraft launched in 1993